A plantation is an agricultural estate, generally centered on a plantation house, meant for farming that specializes in cash crops, usually mainly planted with a single crop, with perhaps ancillary areas for vegetables for eating and so on. The crops that are grown include cotton, cannabis, coffee, tea, cocoa, sugar cane, opium, sisal, oil seeds, oil palms, fruits, rubber trees and forest trees. Protectionist policies and natural comparative advantage have sometimes contributed to determining where plantations are located.

In modern use, the term usually refers only to large-scale estates. Nevertheless, before about 1800, it was the usual term for a farm of any size in the southern parts of British North America, with, as Noah Webster noted, "farm" becoming the usual term from about Maryland northward. It was used in most British colonies but very rarely in the United Kingdom itself in this sense. There, as also in America, it was used mainly for tree plantations, areas artificially planted with trees, whether purely for commercial forestry, or partly for ornamental effect in gardens and parks, when it might also cover plantings of garden shrubs.

Among the earliest examples of plantations were the latifundia of the Roman Empire, which produced large quantities of grain, wine, and olive oil for export. Plantation agriculture proliferated with the increase in international trade and the development of a worldwide economy that followed the expansion of European colonialism.

Tree plantations

Tree plantations, in the United States often called tree farms, are established for the commercial production of timber or tree products such as palm oil, coffee, or rubber. 

Teak and bamboo plantations in India have given good results and an alternative crop solution to farmers of central India, where conventional farming was widespread. But due to the rising input costs of agriculture, many farmers have done teak and bamboo plantations, which require very little water (only during the first two years). Teak and bamboo have legal protection from theft. Bamboo, once planted, gives output for 50 years till flowering occurs. Teak requires 20 years to grow to full maturity and fetch returns.

These may be established for watershed or soil protection. They are established for erosion control, landslide stabilization, and windbreaks. Such plantations are established to foster native species and promote forest regeneration on degraded lands as a tool of environmental restoration.

Ecological impact
Probably the most critical factor a plantation has on the local environment is the site where the plantation is established. In Brazil, coffee plantations would use slash-and-burn agriculture, tearing down rainforests and planting coffee trees that depleted the nutrients in soil. Once the soil had been sapped, growers would move on to another place. If a natural forest is cleared for a planted forest, then a reduction in biodiversity and loss of habitat will likely result. In some cases, their establishment may involve draining wetlands to replace mixed hardwoods that formerly predominated with pine species.
If a plantation is established on abandoned agricultural land or highly degraded land, it can increase both habitat and biodiversity. A planted forest can be profitably established on lands that will not support agriculture or suffer from a lack of natural regeneration.

The tree species used in a plantation are also an important factor. Where non-native varieties or species are grown, few native faunas are adapted to exploit these, and further biodiversity loss occurs. However, even non-native tree species may serve as corridors for wildlife and act as a buffer for native forests, reducing edge effect.

Once a plantation is established, managing it becomes an important environmental factor. The most critical aspect of management is the rotation period. Plantations harvested on more extended rotation periods (30 years or more) can provide similar benefits to a naturally regenerated forest managed for wood production on a similar rotation. This is especially true if native species are used. In the case of exotic species, the habitat can be improved significantly if the impact is mitigated by measures such as leaving blocks of native species in the plantation or retaining corridors of natural forest. In Brazil, similar measures are required by government regulation.

Sugar

Sugar plantations were highly valued in the Caribbean by the British and French colonists in the 17th and 18th centuries, and the use of sugar in Europe rose during this period. Sugarcane is still an important crop in Cuba. Sugar plantations also arose in countries such as Barbados and Cuba because of the natural endowments that they had. These natural endowments included soil conducive to growing sugar and a high marginal product of labor realized through the increasing number of enslaved people.

Rubber

Plantings of the Pará rubber tree (Hevea brasiliensis) are usually called plantations.

Oil palm
Oil palm agriculture rapidly expands across wet tropical regions and is usually developed at a plantation scale.

Orchards
Fruit orchards are sometimes considered to be plantations.

Arable crops
These include tobacco, sugarcane, pineapple, bell pepper, and cotton, especially in historical usage.

Before the rise of cotton in the American South, indigo and rice were also sometimes called plantation crops.

Fishing
When Newfoundland was colonized by England in 1610, the original colonists were called "planters", and their fishing rooms were known as "fishing plantations". These terms were used well into the 20th century.

The following three plantations are maintained by the Government of Newfoundland and Labrador as provincial heritage sites:
 Sea-Forest Plantation was a 17th-century fishing plantation established at Cuper's Cove (present-day Cupids) under a royal charter issued by King James I.
 Mockbeggar Plantation is an 18th-century fishing plantation at Bonavista.
 Pool Plantation a 17th-century fishing plantation maintained by Sir David Kirke and his heirs at Ferryland. The plantation was destroyed by French invaders in 1696.

Other fishing plantations:
 Bristol's Hope Plantation, a 17th-century fishing plantation established at Harbour Grace, created by the Bristol Society of Merchant-Adventurers.
 Benger Plantation, an 18th-century fishing plantation maintained by James Benger and his heirs at Ferryland. It was built on the site of a Georgia plantation.
 Piggeon's Plantation, an 18th-century fishing plantation maintained by Ellias Piggeon at Ferryland.

Plantation slave economy

Plantation owners extensively used enslaved Africans to work on early plantations (such as tobacco, rice, cotton, hemp, and sugar plantations) in the American colonies and the United States, throughout the Caribbean, the Americas, and in European-occupied areas of Africa.

In modern times, the low wages typically paid to plantation workers are the basis of plantation profitability in some areas.

In more recent times, overt slavery has been replaced by para-slavery or slavery-in-kind, including the sharecropping system, and even that has been severely reduced. At its most extreme, workers are in "debt bondage": they must work to pay off a debt at such punitive interest rates that it may never be paid off. Others work unreasonably long hours and are paid subsistence wages that (in practice) may only be spent in the company store.

In Brazil, a sugarcane plantation was termed an engenho ("engine"), and the 17th-century English usage for organized colonial production was "factory." Such colonial social and economic structures are discussed at Plantation economy.

Sugar workers on plantations in Cuba and elsewhere in the Caribbean lived in company towns known as bateyes.

American South

See also

 Forest farming
 List of plantations
 Plantation complexes in the Southern United States
 Slavery in the United States
 Sugar plantations in the Caribbean

References
Notes

Bibliography
 Aldhous, J. R. & Low, A. J. (1974). The potential of Western Hemlock, Western Red Cedar, Grand Fir, and Noble Fir in Britain. Forestry Commission Bulletin 49.
 Everard, J. E. & Fourt, D. F. (1974). Monterey Pine and Bishop Pine as plantation trees in southern Britain. Quarterly Journal of Forestry 68: 111–25.
 Lewes, Diana, A Year in Jamaica: Memoirs of a girl in Arcadia in 1889 (Eland, 2013) 
 Savill, P. Evans, J. Auclair, D. Falk, J. (1997). Plantation Silviculture in Europe. Oxford University Press. Oxford. 
 Sedjo, R. A. & Botkin, D. (1997). Using forest plantations to spare natural forests. Environment 39 (10): 15–20, 30
 Thompson, Edgar Tristram. The Plantation edited by Sidney Mintz and George Baca (University of South Carolina Press; 2011) 176 pp. 1933 dissertation
 Virts, Nancy, "Change in the Plantation System: American South, 1910–1945," Explorations in Economic History, 43 (Jan. 2006), 153–76.

External links

 Trends in Round wood production
 Earth Repair Network Advocates plantation forestry.
 "Pulping the South" Criticism of industrial plantations.
 NGO World Rainforest Movement

Agricultural establishments
Forest management